Booco is an archaeological site in the northeastern Bari province of Somalia.

Overview

Booco is situated in the Aluula District, near Aluula.

The site features a number of ancient structures. Two of these are enclosed platform monuments set together, which are surrounded by small stone circles. The circles of stone are believed to mark associated graves.

See also
Damo
Mosylon
Somali aristocratic and court titles

Notes

References
Booco, Somalia

Archaeological sites in Somalia
Ancient Somalia
Bari, Somalia
Archaeological sites of Eastern Africa